The 2022 Massachusetts gubernatorial election was held on November 8, 2022, to elect the governor of Massachusetts. Republican former state representative Geoff Diehl, Democratic state attorney general Maura Healey, and Libertarian Kevin Reed sought to succeed incumbent Republican governor Charlie Baker, who did not seek re-election after two terms. The race was one of six Republican-held governorships up for election in 2022 in a state carried by Joe Biden in the 2020 presidential election and the only race in which the incumbent was retiring despite being eligible for re-election. 

Primary elections were held on September 6, with Diehl and Healey winning against minimal opposition. Due to Massachusetts's strong liberal lean and Diehl's conservative political views, Healey was widely expected to win the election. The election was called for the Democrat shortly after polls closed, with Healey becoming the first woman ever elected governor of Massachusetts and the first openly lesbian governor to take office in United States history.

In addition, with the election of Kim Driscoll as lieutenant governor, Massachusetts became one of the first two states to simultaneously elect women as governor and lieutenant governor, with Arkansas simultaneously doing the same. Taking 63.7% of the vote, Healey's performance was the strongest of any Democratic gubernatorial candidate in the state since Michael Dukakis in 1986, the best performance in history for a non-incumbent Democrat, and the best performance for any non-incumbent since Channing Cox in 1920. Healey also made history by receiving over 1.5 million votes, the most ever received by a Democratic gubernatorial candidate in Massachusetts history. 

This election constituted the largest shift by partisan margin of any 2022 gubernatorial election, swinging from a 33.5 point margin of victory for the Republican in 2018 to a 29.1 point margin for the Democrat in 2022. Additionally, every county in the state flipped from Republican to Democratic, a feat which had not occurred in any gubernatorial election since Wyoming's in 2010.

Republican primary

Governor

Candidates

Nominee
Geoff Diehl, former state representative (2011–2019) and nominee for U.S. Senate in 2018 (running with Leah Cole Allen)

Eliminated in primary
Chris Doughty, businessman (running with Kate Campanale)

Eliminated at convention or did not file
Shiva Ayyadurai, lecturer, entrepreneur and candidate for U.S. Senate in 2018 and 2020
Darius Mitchell, perennial candidate
Philip Mitza, running as a write-in candidate
Joselito Santiago Matias, tech support specialist

Withdrawn 
Kimberly Duffy, businesswoman

Declined 
Charlie Baker, Governor of Massachusetts (2015–2023)
Scott Brown, former U.S. Senator from Massachusetts (2010–2013), former U.S. Ambassador to New Zealand and Samoa (2017–2020), and nominee for U.S. Senate from New Hampshire in 2014
Mike Kennealy, Secretary of Housing and Economic Development for the Commonwealth of Massachusetts 
Andrew Lelling, former United States Attorney for the District of Massachusetts (2017–2021)
Scott Lively, anti-gay activist, independent candidate for governor in 2014 and Republican candidate for governor in 2018
Shaunna O'Connell, mayor of Taunton (2020–present) and former state representative (2011-2020)
Patrick O'Connor, state senator (2016–present)
Karyn Polito, Lieutenant Governor of Massachusetts (2015–2023)
Jane Swift, former acting governor (2001–2003) and former lieutenant governor (1999–2003)

Endorsements

Polling

Results

Lieutenant governor

Candidates

Nominee
Leah Cole Allen, former state representative (2013–2015) (running with Geoff Diehl)

Eliminated in primary
Kate Campanale, former state representative (2014–2019) (running with Chris Doughty)

Withdrew
Ron Beaty, former Barnstable County commissioner (2017–2021) (running for Barnstable County Commission)
Rayla Campbell, write-in candidate for Massachusetts's 7th congressional district in 2020 (running for Secretary of the Commonwealth)

Declined
Cecilia Calabrese, Agawam city councilor (running for state senate)
Karyn Polito, Lieutenant Governor of Massachusetts (2015–2023)

Endorsements

Polling

Results

Democratic primary

Governor

Candidates

Nominee
Maura Healey, Attorney General of Massachusetts (2015–2023)

Withdrawn
 Danielle Allen, political science professor at Harvard University (endorsed Healey)
Sonia Chang-Díaz, state senator (2009–2023) (remained on ballot)
Scott Donohue, Melrose resident (running for lieutenant governor)
Benjamin Downing, former state senator (2007–2017)

Declined
Jake Auchincloss, U.S. Representative for Massachusetts's 4th congressional district (2021–present) (running for re-election) (endorsed Healey)
Michael Bellotti, Norfolk County Treasurer (2021–present) and former Norfolk County Sheriff (1999–2018)
Mo Cowan, former U.S. Senator (2013)
Joseph Curtatone, former mayor of Somerville (2004–2022)
Michael Dukakis, former Governor of Massachusetts (1975–79, 1983–91) and nominee for president in 1988
Annissa Essaibi George, former at-large Boston city councilor (2016–2022) and candidate for mayor of Boston in 2021
Deb Goldberg, Treasurer and Receiver-General of Massachusetts (2015–present) (running for re-election)
Jay Gonzalez, former Secretary of Administration and Finance of Massachusetts (2009–2013) and Democratic nominee for governor in 2018
Paul Heroux, mayor of Attleboro (2018–present) and former state representative (2013–2018) (running for Bristol County Sheriff)
Joe Kennedy III, former U.S. Representative for Massachusetts's 4th congressional district (2013–21) and candidate for U.S. Senate in 2020
Joshua Kraft, CEO of the Kraft Foundation and son of Businessman Robert Kraft
Bob Massie, Episcopal minister, nominee for Lieutenant Governor in 1994, candidate for U.S. Senate in 2012, and candidate for Governor in 2018
Jon Mitchell, mayor of New Bedford (2011–present)
Alex Morse, former mayor of Holyoke (2012–2021), current town manager of Provincetown (2021–present), and candidate for Massachusetts's 1st congressional district in 2020
Tim Murray, former lieutenant governor of Massachusetts (2007–2013)
Richard Neal, U.S. Representative for Massachusetts's 1st congressional district (2013–present), former U.S. Representative for Massachusetts's 2nd congressional district (1989–2013) (running for re-election)
Ayanna Pressley, U.S. Representative for Massachusetts's 7th congressional district (2019–present) (running for re-election)
Bob Rivers, Chairman and CEO of Eastern Bank
Marty Walsh, U.S. Secretary of Labor (2021–present) and former mayor of Boston (2014–2021)
Elizabeth Warren, U.S. Senator (2013–present) and 2020 Democratic candidate for President

Endorsements

Polling

Results

Convention

Primary

Lieutenant governor

Nominee
Kim Driscoll, mayor of Salem

Eliminated in Primary
Tami Gouveia, state representative
Eric Lesser, state senator

Eliminated at convention or did not file
Bret Bero, Babson College lecturer and small business owner (endorsed Lesser)
Scott Donohue, Melrose resident
Adam G. Hinds, state senator

Declined 
Manny Cruz, member of the Salem school committee
Angel Donahue-Rodriguez, deputy chief of staff to Massachusetts Bay Transportation Authority
Dan Koh, chief of staff to U.S. Labor Secretary Marty Walsh, former Andover selectman, and candidate for Massachusetts' 3rd congressional district in 2018

Endorsements

Polling

Results

Convention

Primary

Libertarian Primary

Governor

Candidates

Nominee
 Kevin Reed (not endorsed by Massachusetts Libertarian party)

Withdrew
Carlos Perez

Lieutenant governor

Candidates

Nominee
Peter Everett

Independents

Candidates

Failed to qualify for ballot
Dianna Ploss, former radio host

General election

Predictions

Endorsements

Polling
Aggregate polls

Charlie Baker vs. Danielle Allen

Charlie Baker vs. Sonia Chang-Díaz

Charlie Baker vs. Benjamin Downing

Charlie Baker vs. Maura Healey

Charlie Baker vs. Joe Kennedy III

Charlie Baker vs. Orlando Silva

Karyn Polito vs. Danielle Allen

Karyn Polito vs. Sonia Chang-Díaz

Karyn Polito vs. Benjamin Downing

Karyn Polito vs. Maura Healey

Karyn Polito vs. Orlando Silva

Geoff Diehl vs. Maura Healey with Charlie Baker as an independent

Geoff Diehl vs. Sonia Chang-Díaz
Aggregate polls

Chris Doughty vs. Sonia Chang-Díaz
Aggregate polls

Chris Doughty vs. Maura Healey
Aggregate polls

Debates

Results

Results by county

Results by municipality

See also
 2021–2022 Massachusetts legislature

Notes

Partisan clients

References

External links 
Official campaign websites for gubernatorial candidates
 Geoff Diehl (R) for Governor
 Maura Healey (D) for Governor
 Kevin Reed (L) for Governor

Official campaign websites for lieutenant gubernatorial candidates
 Kim Driscoll (D) for Lieutenant Governor
 Peter Everett (L) for Lieutenant Governor

2022
Massachusetts
Gubernatorial